Tingis is a genus of lace bugs in the family Tingidae. There are at least 130 described species in Tingis.

See also
 List of Tingis species

References

Further reading

 
 
 
 
 
 
 
 
 
 
 

Tingidae
Articles created by Qbugbot